The 20th New York State Legislature, consisting of the New York State Senate and the New York State Assembly, met from November 1, 1796, to April 3, 1797, during the second year of John Jay's governorship, first in New York City, then in Albany.

Background
Under the provisions of the New York Constitution of 1777, the State Senators were elected on general tickets in the senatorial districts, and were then divided into four classes. Six senators each drew lots for a term of 1, 2, 3 or 4 years and, beginning at the election in April 1778, every year six Senate seats came up for election to a four-year term. Assemblymen were elected countywide on general tickets to a one-year term, the whole assembly being renewed annually.

In March 1786, the Legislature enacted that future Legislatures meet on the first Tuesday of January of each year unless called earlier by the governor. No general meeting place was determined, leaving it to each Legislature to name the place where to reconvene, and if no place could be agreed upon, the Legislature should meet again where it adjourned.

On July 1, 1795, Stephen Van Rensselaer took office as Lieutenant Governor of New York, leaving a vacancy in the Western District.

On March 4, 1796, the Legislature re-apportioned the Senate and Assembly districts, based on the figures of the New York State Census of 1795. The number of State Senators was increased from 24 to 43, adding 1 to the Southern D.; and 6 each to the other three districts. The number of assemblymen was increased from 70 to 108, double-county districts were separated, and several new counties were created.

At this time the politicians were divided into two opposing political parties: the Federalists and the Democratic-Republicans.

Elections
The State election was held from April 26 to 28, 1796. Senator Selah Strong (Southern D.) was re-elected. Assemblymen James Watson (Southern D.), Thomas Morris, Johannes Dietz, Jacob Morris, Leonard Bronck and Francis Nicoll (all five Western D.) were elected to the Senate. Samuel Haight, Andrew Onderdonk (both Southern D.), Robert Sands, Christopher Tappen, William Thompson (all three Middle D.), Ebenezer Clark, Moses Vail, James Savage, Peter Silvester, Anthony Ten Eyck (all five Eastern D.), Jedediah Sanger, James Gordon, Leonard Gansevoort, Thomas R. Gold, John Richardson, Vincent Mathews, Joseph White and Abraham Arndt (all eight Western D.) were also elected to the Senate. All, except Christopher Tappen, were Federalists.

Upon taking their seats, the new senators were classified: Ebenezer Clark, Anthony Ten Eyck, Thomas Morris and John Richardson drew 1-year terms; James Watson, Leonard Gansevoort, Francis Nicoll, Abraham Arndt, Johannes Dietz and Thomas R. Gold drew 2-year terms; Christopher Tappen, Moses Vail, Vincent Mathews and Joseph White drew 3-year terms; and Samuel Haight, Andrew Onderdonk, Selah Strong, Robert Sands, James Savage, Peter Silvester, William Thompson, Leonard Bronck, Jacob Morris, James Gordon and Jedediah Sanger drew 4-year terms.

Sessions

The Legislature met at Federal Hall in New York City on November 1, 1796, to elect presidential electors, and both Houses adjourned on November 11. This was the last session not held in Albany.

Federalist Gulian Verplanck was elected Speaker.

To balance the representation of the senatorial districts, the re-apportionment was amended, transferring Columbia Co. from the Eastern to the Middle District; and Albany and Saratoga counties from the Western to the Eastern D. Thus senators Spencer, Savage and Silvester moved from the Eastern to the Middle; and Bronck, Gansevoort, Gordon, Nicoll, Schuyler and Van Schoonhoven from the Western to the Eastern District.

On November 7, 1796, the Legislature elected 12 presidential electors, all Federalists: Lewis Morris, Abijah Hammond, Richard Thorne, Peter Cantine Jr., Robert Van Rensselaer, Johannes Miller, Abraham Ten Broeck, Abraham Van Vechten, St. John Honeywood, William Root, Peter Smith and Charles Newkirk. They cast their votes for John Adams and Thomas Pinckney.

On November 9, 1796, the Legislature elected U.S. District Judge John Laurance to the U.S. Senate, to fill the vacancy caused by the resignation of Rufus King.

The Legislature met for the regular session on January 3, 1797, at the Old City Hall in Albany, New York; and both Houses adjourned on April 3.

On January 24, 1797, the Legislature elected Senator Philip Schuyler to the U.S. Senate, to succeed Aaron Burr, for a 6-year term beginning on March 4, 1797.

Among the legislative acts of this session were: the declaration of Albany as the State capital, and plans to build a State capitol; the creation of the office of New York State Comptroller; and the creation of Delaware County, with 2 seats in the Assembly.

State Senate

Districts
The Southern District (9 seats) consisted of Kings, New York, Queens, Richmond, Suffolk and Westchester counties.
The Middle District (12 seats) consisted of Dutchess, Orange, Ulster and Columbia counties.
The Eastern District (11 seats) consisted of Washington, Clinton, Rensselaer, Albany and Saratoga counties.
The Western District (11 seats) consisted of  Montgomery, Herkimer, Ontario, Otsego, Tioga, Onondaga and Schoharie counties.

Note: There are now 62 counties in the State of New York. The counties which are not mentioned in this list had not yet been established, or sufficiently organized, the area being included in one or more of the abovementioned counties.

Members
The asterisk (*) denotes members of the previous Legislature who continued in office as members of this Legislature. James Watson, Leonard Bronck, Francis Nicoll, Johannes Dietz, Jacob Morris and Thomas Morris changed from the Assembly to the Senate.

Note: The table shows the Districts as re-apportioned after the election.

Employees
Clerk: Abraham B. Bancker

State Assembly

Districts

Albany County (10 seats)
Clinton County (1 seat)
Columbia County (6 seats)
Dutchess County (10 seats)
Herkimer County (7 seats)
Kings County (1 seat)
Montgomery County (6 seats)
The City and County of New York (13 seats)
Onondaga County (2 seats)
Ontario County (2 seats)
Orange County (3 seats)
Otsego County (5 seats)
Queens County (4 seats)
Rensselaer County (6 seats)
Richmond County (1 seat)
Saratoga County (5 seats)
Schoharie County (1 seat)
Suffolk County (4 seats)
Tioga County (2 seats)
Ulster County (8 seats)
Washington County (6 seats)
Westchester County (5 seats)

Note: There are now 62 counties in the State of New York. The counties which are not mentioned in this list had not yet been established, or sufficiently organized, the area being included in one or more of the abovementioned counties.

Assemblymen
The asterisk (*) denotes members of the previous Legislature who continued as members of this Legislature.

Employees
Clerk: James Van Ingen
Sergeant-at-Arms: Robert Hunter
Doorkeeper: Richard Ten Eyck

Notes

Sources
The New York Civil List compiled by Franklin Benjamin Hough (Weed, Parsons and Co., 1858) [see pg. 108f for Senate districts; pg. 116 for senators; pg. 148f for Assembly districts; pg. 170f for assemblymen; pg. 323 for presidential electors]
Election result Assembly, Dutchess Co. at project "A New Nation Votes", compiled by Phil Lampi, hosted by Tufts University Digital Library
Election result Assembly, Herkimer Co. at project "A New Nation Votes"
Election result Assembly, Onondaga Co. at project "A New Nation Votes"
Election result Assembly, Ontario Co. at project "A New Nation Votes"
Election result Assembly, Rensselaer Co. at project "A New Nation Votes"
Election result Assembly, Schoharie Co. at project "A New Nation Votes"
Election result Assembly, Westchester Co. at project "A New Nation Votes"
Election result Senate, Southern D. at project "A New Nation Votes" [gives votes only from Queens Co.]

1796 in New York (state)
1797 in New York (state)
020